Himmel is an extinct town in Stoddard County, in the U.S. state of Missouri. The GNIS classifies it as a populated place.

A post office called Himmel was established in 1920, and remained in operation until 1923. The community derives its name from the last name of I. Himmelberger, a businessperson in the local lumber industry.

References

Ghost towns in Missouri
Former populated places in Stoddard County, Missouri
1920 establishments in Missouri